This is a list of main career statistics of American professional tennis player John Isner. All statistics are according to the ATP Tour and ITF website.

Performance timelines

Singles
Current through the 2023 BNP Paribas Open.

Doubles 

 * not held due to COVID-19 pandemic.

Significant finals

Masters 1000 finals

Singles: 5 (1 title, 4 runner-ups)

Doubles: 8 (5 titles, 3 runner-ups)

ATP career finals

Singles: 31 (16 titles, 15 runner-ups)

Doubles: 14 (8 titles, 6 runner-ups)

Other finals

Team competition: 2 (1 title, 1 runner-up)

Record against top 10 players 

Isner's match record against players who have been ranked world No. 10 or higher, with those who are active in boldface.

Top 10 wins 
Isner has a  record against players who were, at the time the match was played, ranked in the top 10.

See also 

 List of ATP Tour top-level tournament singles champions
 List of Tennis Masters Series doubles champions
 Longest tennis match records
 Longest tiebreaker in tennis
United States Davis Cup team
List of United States Davis Cup team representatives
Fastest recorded tennis serves

References

External links 
 
 
 

Isner, John